The Filmfare Short Film Awards are held annually by Worldwide Media. Started in 2016, the short film awards are a part of WWM's and Filmfare's ongoing transition onto the digital platform. These awards invite first-time as well as professional filmmakers to submit their entries, following which a panel of filmmakers judges and honours them with Filmfare Awards in five categories.

History 
The first ever Filmfare Awards for short films were held in 2016. The awards were announced for the first time, in December 2016. The first ceremony was held in January 2017 along with the annual 62nd Filmfare Awards 2017 in Mumbai. The announcement of the first ever Filmfare Awards for short films was made through a Facebook live stream. It's an initiative to promote and facilitate new filmmaking talent through the Filmfare Awards.
The second edition of the Filmfare Short Film Awards will be held in January 2018 along with the 63rd Filmfare Awards in Mumbai.

Jury Selection 
Filmfare, decided to start a digital short film festival primarily aiming to promote the new medium of filmmaking. The first year saw industry bigwigs like Karan Johar, Vidya Balan, Aanand L Rai, Kabir Khan, Zoya Akhtar and Gauri Shinde lend their support to the Filmfare Short Film Awards. This astute jury selected films in four categories. 
 
The second year of the Short Film Awards features Karan Johar, Nikkhil Advani, Kabir Khan, Onir and Shakun Batra as the panel of jury members.

Award Categories 
Filmfare's short film awards are given in five exclusive categories. Four are adjudged by the jury while the People's Choice Award is handed to the entry that gets the maximum public votes via Filmfare's digital platforms.
 
The Short Film Jury awards honours in the Best Film Fiction, Best Film Non-Fiction, Best Actor (Male) and Best Actor (Female) categories.

Nominations Process 
The first stage of the nomination process involves submission of entries to the Filmfare Awards platform. Once the final entries have been received a careful and vigilant screen process by the Filmfare edit team and the jury members selects a final 30 films that are considered for the five categories. All 30 films are eligible for jury and public votes thereafter.

Winners’ announcement 
Winners of the Short Film Awards were announced on Filmfare's digital platforms prior to the ceremony in January 2017. The first year saw Manoj Bajpayee win the Best Actor award for his efforts on the short film Taandav. Tisca Chopra was awarded the Best Actor (Female) trophy for her performance in Chutney. Director Jyoti Kapur Das won the Best Film Fiction Award for Chutney as well. The documentary Matitali Kushti won the Best film Non-Fiction Award while Aarti S Bagdi's Khamakha won the People's Choice Award.

See also
 Bollywood
 Cinema of India
 Filmfare
 Filmfare Awards

References

External links
 

Short film festivals
Filmfare Awards
Indian film awards
Bollywood film awards
Events of The Times Group
Film industry in Mumbai
Short film awards